David Howell (born 10 October 1958) is an English former footballer who played as a central defender. Most recently he was the manager of St Albans City until November 2012.

Playing career

Howell started his professional career with Fulham in 1978, but failed to reach the first team. He then moved on to various non-league clubs, including Harrow Borough (whom he helped win the 1984 Isthmian League Premier Division Championship), Hounslow Town, Hillingdon Borough and Enfield. He was also a Semi-pro international, achieving the honour of being the first black England National Game XI captain.

In July 1990 he joined Barnet for £10,000.
Dave made his debut as a substitute for Barnet in the following line up on 18 August 1990 at Macclesfield Town :
Gary Phillips, Paul Wilson, Geoff Cooper, Richard Nugent, Mick Bodley, Edwin Stein, Paul Harding, Derek Payne, Andy Clarke, David Gipp and Gary Bull. Subs David Howell and Wayne Turner.

He scored a headed goal on the final day of the 1990-91 season to help Barnet win the Football Conference League, and thereby gain promotion to the Football League Fourth Division.

In 1991-92 he made 34 appearances, scoring 3 goals as Barnet reached 7th place, but failed to gain promotion via the play-offs losing to Blackpool. However David was voted Player of the Year by the Barnet Football Club Supporters Association.
In the following season (1992-93) he made a further 23 appearances as Barnet finished 3rd in the renamed Barclays League Division 3, thereby gaining promotion to Division 2.

In July 1993 he joined Division 1 team Southend United for whom he made 6 appearances. There, Dave became the oldest player ever at the time to sign a full professional playing contract for the first time superseding Tony Book of Manchester City. At the end of the 1993–94 season he was released and in October 1994 (now aged 36) he joined Birmingham City on a non-contract basis, playing twice for them in division 2.

Howell then played for Stevenage Borough before retiring as a player.

Managerial career
Whilst at Barnet, Southend United and Birmingham City, Howell worked with Barry Fry and Edwin Stein as part of the management team. He later returned to Harrow Borough as assistant manager to Stein. In November 2003 he took over as caretaker manager to take the position permanently in the following February. In June 2011 he left Harrow Borough after leading them to their best season, in recent times, to become manager of the recently relegated St Albans City, who will be playing in the Southern Football League in the 2011/2012 season. David was sacked as St Albans City manager in November 2012.

Honours
Enfield
FA Trophy
APL championship

Barnet
Football Conference

References

External links
 Profile on Soccerbase.com
 St Albans City F.C. website
Reckless Guide to Barnet Football Club - David Howell

1958 births
Living people
Footballers from Hammersmith
English footballers
Association football defenders
Fulham F.C. players
Hillingdon Borough F.C. players
Hounslow F.C. players
Harrow Borough F.C. players
Enfield F.C. players
Barnet F.C. players
Southend United F.C. players
Birmingham City F.C. players
Aylesbury United F.C. players
Stevenage F.C. players
Isthmian League players
National League (English football) players
English Football League players
English football managers
Harrow Borough F.C. managers
St Albans City F.C. managers
Isthmian League managers
Southend United F.C. non-playing staff
Birmingham City F.C. non-playing staff
Black British sportsmen